Aud Kari Berg (born 2 June 1976) is a Norwegian former professional racing cyclist. She won the Norwegian National Road Race Championship in 2000 and 2001.

References

External links

1976 births
Living people
Norwegian female cyclists
Place of birth missing (living people)